Arnór Dan Arnarson (often credited as Arnór Dan) is an Icelandic musician best known as the lead singer of the progressive rock band Agent Fresco, as well as for his collaborations with Icelandic multi-instrumentalist Ólafur Arnalds. He was selected male vocalist of the year at the Icelandic Music Awards in 2016.

Career
Arnór Dan got his musical start in a high-school band called Rosa. In 2008, he helped found the progressive rock band Agent Fresco, which has since released two studio albums and one EP. He has frequently collaborated with fellow Icelandic musician Ólafur Arnalds.
He contributed vocals on four tracks of the 2013 Ólafur Arnalds album For Now I Am Winter, and in 2015 he contributed vocals to the songs ("So Close", "So Far", and "Take My Leave of You") on the Broadchurch soundtrack, also composed by Arnalds.
Arnór Dan was featured on several songs of the soundtrack for the 2014 TV Anime Terror in Resonance.
In 2018, Arnór Dan released his debut solo single, titled "Stone by Stone", which was co-written with Janus Rasmussen (Kiasmos) and Sakaris Emil Joensen.

Discography

with Agent Fresco
Albums
 A Long Time Listening (2010)
 Destrier (2015)

EPs
 Lightbulb Universe (2008)

Solo
Singles
 "Stone by Stone" (2018)

Contributions
 "Út" Föstudagurinn Langi (Úlfur Úlfur, 2011)
 "For Now I Am Winter" For Now I Am Winter (Ólafur Arnalds, 2013)
 "A Stutter" For Now I Am Winter (Ólafur Arnalds, 2013)
 "Reclaim" For Now I Am Winter (Ólafur Arnalds, 2013)
 "Old Skin" For Now I Am Winter (Ólafur Arnalds, 2013)
 "No. Other" For Now I Am Winter (Ólafur Arnalds, 2013)
 "Von" Terror in Resonance OST (Yoko Kanno, 2014)
 "Birden" Terror in Resonance OST (Yoko Kanno, 2014)
 "Bless" Terror in Resonance OST (Yoko Kanno, 2014)
 "Akkeri" Tvær Plánetur (Úlfur Úlfur, 2015)
 "So Close" Broadchurch OST (Ólafur Arnalds, 2015)
 "So Far" Broadchurch OST (Ólafur Arnalds, 2015)
 "Say My Name" (Destiny's Child cover) Late Night Tales: Ólafur Arnalds (Ólafur Arnalds, 2016)
 "Waves" Waves - Single (Hugar, 2016)
 "Take My Leave of You" Broadchurch – The Final Chapter (Music from the Original TV Series) (Ólafur Arnalds, 2017)
 "Gravity" Made in Abyss Original Soundtrack 3 (Kevin Penkin, 2022)

References

External links
 

1985 births
Icelandic composers
Icelandic male musicians
Living people